Safarova is a feminine surname, found in Russia, Czech Republic, Tajikistan, and Azerbaijan. The male counterpart surname is Safarov. People with the name Safarova include:

 Alena Šafářová (born 1968), Czech table tennis player
 Irina Safarova (born 1969), Russian long-distance runner
 Khalida Safarova (1926–2005), Azerbaijani painter
 Lucie Šafářová (born 1987), Czech former professional tennis player
 Maryam Safarova (born 2003), Azerbaijani group rhythmic gymnast
 Zemfira Safarova (born 1937), Azerbaijani and Soviet musicologist
 Zuleykha Safarova (born 1999), Azerbaijani tennis player

Azerbaijani-language surnames
Russian-language surnames
Czech-language surnames
Slavic-language female forms of surnames